I Love You is a 1979 Indian Telugu-language film that was directed by Vayu Nandana Rao. This film starred Chiranjeevi, Suvarna, Prasad Babu, P. L. Narayana and others. It was simultaneously filmed in Kannada with the same title starring Shankar Nag with Suvarna reprising her role.

Plot
Ramesh's (Chiranjeevi) daily routine involves driving along with his friends, seducing young women and ditching them. He targets Suvarna, a middle-class girl who has comes from a village for her education. Suvarna is accompanied by her cousin Prasad Babu who wants to marry her and becomes jealous when he finds Suvarna in Ramesh's car. He warns her, but Suvarna gets attracted towards Ramesh and one day, Ramesh ditches her. Later, Suvarna knows that Ramesh met with an accident and is now unable to walk and is spending time in a wheelchair. She uses Ramesh's cousin and finds a place in his home and treats him as a nurse.

Meanwhile, Ramesh's mother and uncle plan to get him married to his uncle's daughter. Suvarna teases Ramesh in every possible manner making him realize his mistake and helplessness. Ramesh realizes his mistakes and decides to marry Suvarna and talks to her father. Against her father's will, Suvarna marries Ramesh but discovers that Ramesh lost his potency. Following the advice of her doctor, she intentionally hurts Ramesh's ego and leaves his house. Hurt, Ramesh decides to prove himself by standing on his legs. He drives to her house and forces himself on her. In the end, Suvarna is happy that Ramesh got back his legs and a changed Ramesh lives happily with her.

Cast
Chiranjeevi
Srinivasamurthy
Seetharam
Suvarna 
 Mamatha Shehnoy
M.S.Sathyam
Pallavi
Umesh
Jaikumar
Nataraj
Ashwant Narayana
Uma Shivakumar
Sushila Naidu
Sathyakala

Soundtrack 
The soundtrack was composed by Satyam. The song "Oka Matundi" is based on "There's a Kind of Hush" written by Les Reed and Geoff Stephens.

Reception 
Through this film, Chiranjeevi gained recognition as an actor.

References

External links 
 

1979 films
Films scored by Satyam (composer)
1970s Telugu-language films
Indian romance films
Indian multilingual films
1979 multilingual films
1970s romance films